Water Country is a water park located in Portsmouth, New Hampshire, United States. It opened in 1984 and was owned by the Samuels family until they were bought out by Festival Fun Parks in 2000. The park is now owned by Palace Entertainment and has a number of slides and swimming pools that range for all ages. Their commercials feature a jingle that has remained the same since the park opened in 1984. The melody is reminiscent of Mungo Jerry's 1970 hit "In the Summertime". It was composed by Tom Roussell in 1985 while working for Kevin Tracey Productions and later re-recorded when the original 10 year license expired.

Water Country allows its guests to bring picnic lunches into the park. A number of picnic areas are available at various points throughout the park. Alcoholic beverages and smoking, however, are prohibited in the park, as are glass containers. Water Country's mascot was a polar bear named Patches, but Patches was given to Water Country's sister park, Lake Compounce in Connecticut. Water Country no longer has a mascot, but now operates with a surfing theme.

See also
List of water parks

External links
Water Country official website

Palace Entertainment
Buildings and structures in Portsmouth, New Hampshire
Water parks in New Hampshire
Tourist attractions in Portsmouth, New Hampshire
1984 establishments in the United States